Evan Carleton Dertien is a United States Air Force major general who serves as the commander of the Air Force Test Center. He most recently served as the director for air, space, and cyberspace operations of the Air Force Materiel Command and prior to that served as the commander of the Air Force Research Laboratory. In February 2021, he was confirmed for promotion to major general and assigned to become the commander of the Air Force Test Center, replacing Maj Gen Christopher Azzano. He assumed his present assignment on July 15, 2021.

References

External links

Living people
Year of birth missing (living people)
Place of birth missing (living people)
United States Air Force generals